Darjeeling Lok Sabha constituency is one of the 543 parliamentary constituencies in India. The constituency centres on Darjeeling in West Bengal. While five assembly segments are in Darjeeling district, one assembly segment is in Kalimpong district and one assembly segment is in Uttar Dinajpur district.

Assembly segments

As per order of the Delimitation Commission in respect of the delimitation of constituencies in the West Bengal, parliamentary constituency no. 4 Darjeeling is composed of the following segments from 2009:

Members of Parliament

Election results

General election 2019

General election 2014

General election 2009

General election 2004

General elections 1957-2014
Most of the contests were multi-cornered. However, only winners and runners-up are mentioned below:

See also
 Darjeeling district
 List of Constituencies of the Lok Sabha

References

Politics of Darjeeling district
Lok Sabha constituencies in West Bengal
Politics of Gorkhaland